Ellaria Sand is a fictional character in the A Song of Ice and Fire series of high fantasy novels by American author George R. R. Martin and its television adaptation, Game of Thrones.

Ellaria first appears in A Storm of Swords (2000), and while she is only mentioned in A Feast for Crows (2005), she returns in A Dance with Dragons (2011). She is the paramour to Oberyn Martell and mother to several of his bastard daughters, the Sand Snakes. After the death of her lover in a duel at the hands of Ser Gregor Clegane, she is sent into deep mourning, although her subsequent characterization differs between the novels and the television adaptation. In the novels, she sues for peace, seeking an end to the cycle of revenge. In the television adaptation, however, she is portrayed as ruthless and vengeful, willing to do anything to destroy House Lannister, even if it means killing Oberyn's own family in the process.

The character is portrayed by Indira Varma in the HBO television adaptation.

Character description
Ellaria Sand is a bastard of Harmen Uller, head of House Uller and Lord of Hellholt in Dorne. Dorne's views and customs towards children born out of wedlock differ from those of the rest of Westeros, where bastards are often discriminated against. She is the paramour of Oberyn Martell, as even in Dorne a Prince cannot marry a bastard. She is the mother of the youngest four Sand Snakes (Oberyn's bastard daughters). Like Oberyn, she is bisexual.

In the novels, Ellaria Sand is mostly a background character. She is not a point-of-view character; rather, her actions are witnessed and interpreted through the eyes of other people, such as Tyrion Lannister, Arianne Martell, and Areo Hotah.

Storylines

A Storm of Swords 
Ellaria comes with Oberyn to King's Landing, as part of Tyrion Lannister's efforts to win them to the Iron Throne. Oberyn, however, clearly wants revenge for his sister's death, apparently committed on the orders of Tywin Lannister, during King Robert's rebellion. Oberyn wants Ellaria to sit with him at Joffrey Baratheon's wedding, causing trouble when Olenna Tyrell calls her "the serpent's whore". Later, when Tyrion is condemned for poisoning Joffrey Baratheon, Oberyn acts as his champion in a trial by combat against Ser Gregor Clegane, who had raped and murdered Oberyn's sister, Elia Martell, during the Sack of King's Landing. Oberyn wounds Gregor with a poisoned spear but is killed by Gregor. Afterwards, Ellaria returns to Dorne.

A Dance with Dragons 
Gregor Clegane apparently dies of the poison after spending days in agony (Oberyn having treated the poison to work slowly). His skull is sent to Dorne, where Oberyn's brother, Doran Martell, the ruling Prince of Dorne, sees it. Despite Gregor and Tywin's deaths, Oberyn's bastard daughters want revenge. Ellaria argues against revenge, saying all those they want revenge against are dead and the Lannisters they are now targeting took no part in their kin's deaths. She reminds them Oberyn died trying to avenge his sister's death and worries they too will die, if they seek vengeance. Doran sends her back to her father, Lord Harmen Uller of Hellholt with her youngest daughter Loreza Sand.

TV adaptation

Ellaria Sand is played by the British actress Indira Varma in the television adaption of the series of books. She won the Empire Hero Award along with the rest of the cast in 2015. She was also nominated, along with the rest of the cast for Screen Actors Guild Award for Outstanding Performance by an Ensemble in a Drama Series in 2016.

Season 4 
Ellaria Sand's storyline in this season is very similar to her storyline in A Storm of Swords.

Season 5 
Ellaria tries to persuade Doran Martell, Prince of Dorne, to avenge his brother's death. However, Doran refuses, as Oberyn's death was via trial by combat, and therefore by Westerosi law, Gregor Clegane did not murder Oberyn. Ellaria soon learns that Jaime Lannister is sailing for Dorne, planning to rescue his daughter Myrcella, betrothed to Doran's son, Trystane. When Jaime arrives at the Water Gardens, the Sand Snakes attack him and Bronn, but the skirmish ends with all arrested by Martell guards. Doran and Jaime reach a deal, Trystane will marry Myrcella, but the two will live in King's Landing and Trystane will be granted a seat on the Small Council. Ellaria is threatened with death by Doran if she ever defies him and she feigns allegiance to him. She kisses Myrcella goodbye at the docks, secretly wearing lipstick coated with a slow-acting poison, which kills Myrcella on the ship headed for King's Landing.

Season 6 
After Doran Martell realises that Myrcella has been murdered, Ellaria stabs Doran, while in King's Landing, Obara and Nymeria, who had snuck onto the ship headed to King's Landing, kill Trystane. This makes Ellaria the de facto ruler of Dorne. A while later, Ellaria meets Olenna Tyrell, whose son and grandchildren have been killed by Cersei, the present Queen of the Seven Kingdoms. Ellaria then reveals that she has allied herself with Daenerys Targaryen after hearing that Yara and Theon Greyjoy have done the same. Later, Martell and Tyrell ships can be seen in Daenerys' fleet heading for Westeros.

Season 7 
Ellaria and the Sand Snakes arrive in Dragonstone to discuss the conquest of Westeros with Daenerys. Yara and Theon Greyjoy return Ellaria and the Sand Snakes to Dorne so they can gather their army. En route, Euron Greyjoy attacks them and burns Yara's fleet. He kills Obara and Nymeria and captures Yara, and takes Ellaria and Tyene to Cersei, as a gift.

In the dungeons Ellaria and Tyene are chained to the walls and gagged. Cersei recalls the death of Oberyn Martell and explains how much she loved Myrcella. Then she kisses Tyene using the same poison that Ellaria used to murder Myrcella. She tells Ellaria that she will be watching Tyene die and after Tyene's death, she will be kept alive to watch as her daughter's body rots away.

Family tree

References

A Song of Ice and Fire characters
Female characters in literature
Female characters in television
Television characters introduced in 2014
Literary characters introduced in 2000
Fictional characters who committed familicide
Fictional bisexual females
Fictional murderers of children
Fictional LGBT characters in television
Fictional murderers
Fictional nobility
Fictional polyamorous characters
Fictional revolutionaries
Fictional LGBT characters in literature